William Henry McDonald (1899-1967) served for one term as Texas Land Commissioner from 1937 to 1939.  He was elected as a Democrat.

References

Commissioners of the General Land Office of Texas
Texas Democrats
1899 births
1967 deaths
20th-century American politicians